Aglais is a Holarctic genus of brush-footed butterflies, containing the tortoiseshells. This genus is sometimes indicated as a subgenus of Nymphalis or simply being an unnecessary division from the genus Nymphalis, which also includes tortoiseshells, but it is usually considered to be separate. This proposed separate genus is also considered "brushfooted butterflies" historically together with the other or separate Nymphalis species.

Species

References

External links

 With images.

Nymphalini
Butterfly genera
Taxa named by Johan Wilhelm Dalman